Robert Creighton Murphy was an American colonel that served the Union during the American Civil War that primarily operated during the Vicksburg campaign and commanded the 8th Wisconsin.

Biography

Early years
Murphy was born on Chillicothe, Ohio in 1827. He was the first government-salaried U.S. Consul at Shanghai, China from 1853 until June 1857.  In 1859, Murphy moved to Saint Croix Falls, Wisconsin.

American Civil War
Murphy entered military service around 1861 as the 8th Wisconsin Infantry Regiment was created around September 13 but wouldn't see any major operations until an entire year later at the Battle of Iuka. During the battle, Murphy was stationed to guard a small supply depot but on September 14th, applied a scorched earth policy at the depot but the pursuing Confederates doused the fire in time to capture a large amount of supplies as Murphy was captured himself in his pajamas. Afterwards, William Rosecrans relieved Murphy but then ordered him to be court-martialed for his failure to effectively being able to destroy the supplies but Murphy was acquitted of all charges.

Later in the same year, Murphy was put in charge of another supply depot stationed at Holly Springs, Mississippi when Confederate general Earl Van Dorn, lead a raid on the Union forces stationed there and defeated them at the raid which had a heavy toll on Grant's Vicksburg campaign as Murphy was dismissed from the army without a court-martial.

Murphy wrote to Abraham Lincoln to ask for a court-martial or hearing but Adjudant-General Joseph Holt concluded that his dismissal was reasonable as Murphy attempted for the next fifteen years to get a hearing but failed by the end. Murphy died in 1888 in Washington D.C. and was buried at the Congressional Cemetery.

References

1827 births
1888 deaths
Union Army colonels
People from Chillicothe, Ohio
People of Wisconsin in the American Civil War